Copa Tejas is the two cup competitions and one shield between the Major League Soccer, USL Championship and NWSL teams of the state of Texas, awarded by independent supporters groups of the state's teams. It was initially founded in 2019 by supporters of San Antonio FC. It awards a Division 1 trophy for the top Major League Soccer team, a Division 2 trophy for the top USL Championship team, and the Copa Tejas Shield for the best team across all participants. The current Major League Soccer clubs are Austin FC, FC Dallas, and Houston Dynamo FC. The USL Championship clubs are El Paso Locomotive FC, Rio Grande Valley FC, and San Antonio FC. Austin Bold FC announced it will not participate in the 2022 USL Championship season as it actively seeks relocation to another city in Texas. NWSL side Houston Dash participates only in the Copa Tejas Shield as the lone Texas team in the league.

It was first contested in 2019 and was won by Austin Bold FC.

History 

San Antonio FC and Rio Grande Valley FC have competed in the USL since 2016, participating in their own rivalry: the South Texas Derby. With the addition of Austin and El Paso in the 2019 season, the Copa Tejas was created by supporters of San Antonio FC to determine the best team in Texas.

Austin Bold FC claimed the inaugural Copa Tejas with a 3–0 win over Rio Grande Valley FC on September 1, 2019. They finished top of the table with a 3–2–1 (W-D-L) record and 11 points.

Due to the coronavirus pandemic and the rescheduling of the 2020 USL Championship season into group play, El Paso was not included in the group with the other Texas teams. This resulted in the lack of a "fair round-robin format", and so the Copa Tejas was not awarded in 2020.

In 2021, with Austin FC joining Major League Soccer, an MLS division of the competition, called Division 1, was created. This was to supplement the existing Texas Derby which is contested between FC Dallas and Houston Dynamo FC. The USL Championship division would now be known as Division 2.

The Copa Tejas Shield was announced in 2021 as a cross-league award, featuring the teams from both the Division 1 and Division 2 competition and NWSL side Houston Dash.

Division 1

2021

2022

2023

Division 2 

 Franchise relocated after completion of the 2021 USL-C season

2019

2020

2021

2022

2023

Shield 

 Franchise relocated after completion of the 2021 USL-C season

Top Scorers

Division 1 
Stats as of 7/16/2022 – Bold denotes still active with team

Division 2 
Stats as of 9/7/2022 – Bold denotes still active with team

Cup Scoring 

The Division 1 and Division 2 Copa Tejas format is similar to the Cascadia Cup. Points are earned during the regular season: three for a victory, one for a draw, and no points for a loss. The team that accumulates the most points during the regular USL season, excluding possible U.S. Open Cup match ups and league playoffs, will be awarded the trophy at the conclusion of the league season, and will keep it and bragging rights for a year. If a tiebreaker is necessary, it will be determined from goal differential and other criteria.

The winner each year is decided by these criteria, in order:

 Greater number of points earned in matches between the teams concerned
 Greater goal difference in matches between the teams concerned
 Greater number of goals scored in matches between the teams concerned
 Reapply first three criteria if two or more teams are still tied
 Greater goal difference in all cup matches
 Greater number of goals scored in all cup matches
 Smaller number of disciplinary points in all cup matches (yellow = 1 point, red = 2 points)

Shield Scoring 
The Copa Tejas Shield format is similar to the Supporters Shield awarded by Major League Soccer's Supporters Shield Foundation. Total points for a team across a its regular season will be divided by the number of matches played for an average points per game total. The team with the highest average points per game will be awarded the Copa Tejas Shield. In the event of a tiebreaker, the following criteria will be used to break the tie:

 Goal difference average
 Fewest disciplinary points
 Away goals average
 Away goal difference
 Home goals average
 Home goal difference
 Coin toss if two teams tied and draw straws if three teams tied.

References

External links
 

Austin Bold FC
Austin FC
FC Dallas
El Paso Locomotive FC
Houston Dash
Houston Dynamo FC
Rio Grande Valley FC Toros
San Antonio FC
Soccer in Texas
Soccer rivalries in the United States
Soccer cup competitions in the United States
Recurring sporting events established in 2019